Titan: The Arena is a card game that was published by The Avalon Hill Game Company in 1993.

Gameplay
Titan: The Arena is a game in which eight fantasy creatures compete in an arena.

Publication history
It was republished by Fantasy Flight Games under the title Colossal Arena in 2004. A reimagination of the game was published in 2021 by Plan B Games under the title Equinox.

Reception
The reviewer from Pyramid #29 (Jan./Feb., 1998) stated that "Titan - the Arena is a very good game".

Reviews
Dragon #243 (January 1998)
Backstab #8

References

Avalon Hill games
Card games introduced in 1993